Moon is the New Earth is the second album by American power trio Rose Hill Drive. The album was released on June 24, 2008. The first track on the album, 'Sneak Out', was released as a single. On the evening of July 29, 2008, Rose Hill Drive performed "Sneak Out" on Late Night with Conan O'Brien.

Track listing
"Sneak Out" – 3:34
"Altar Junkie" - 3:33
"Laughing in the Streets" - 3:24
"Trans Am" - 3:45
"A Better Way" - 4:57
"My Light" - 3:43
"The 8th Wonder" - 4:36
"One Night Stand" - 3:10
"Godfather" - 3:47
"Do You Wanna Get High?" - 3:46
"I'm on to You" - 4:03
"Always Waiting" - 4:11

All songs written and performed by Rose Hill Drive.

Credits
Daniel Sproul, guitars and backing vocals
Jacob Sproul, bass guitar and lead vocals
Nathan Barnes, drums

Rose Hill Drive albums
2008 albums